William Piers (20 May 1686 – 1755) of West Bradley, Somerset was a British Whig politician who sat in the House of Commons between 1716 and 1741.

Early life
Prers was the eldest son of William Piers of Wells and his wife Catherine Coward, daughter of William Coward, recorder of Wells.

Career
Piers was one of the leading Whigs at Wells and he stood for Wells several times, but was only  returned three times on petition after being defeated at the poll four times. Following the 1715 British general election, he was returned as Member of Parliament for Wells on petition on 30 May 1716. He was defeated   at the 1722 British general election. He was defeated again at the 1727 British general election but was this time seated on petition on 18 April 1729. At the  1734 British general election when he had the active support of Walpole, he was defeated at the poll, but returned on petition on 25 March 1735. He did not stand in  1741. He stood at the  1747 British general election but withdrew his petition after presenting it.  He voted consistently with the Government.

Piers completed building work at Bradley House in 1726 and included ornamental canals in the grounds.

Personal life
Piers married Elizabeth Ekins, daughter of Harvey Ekins of Weston Favell, Northamptonshire by marriage settlement of 29 December 1708.
 Together, they were the parents of one son and two daughters, including:

 Elizabeth Piers (d. 1782), who married Capt. Lord Montagu Bertie (d. 1753), a son of Robert Bertie, 1st Duke of Ancaster and Kesteven and, his second wife, Albinia Farington.

He died in 1755.

Descendants
Through his daughter Elizabeth, he was a grandfather of Augusta Bertie, who married John Fane, 9th Earl of Westmorland.

References

1686 births
1755 deaths
Members of the Parliament of Great Britain for English constituencies
British MPs 1715–1722
British MPs 1727–1734
British MPs 1734–1741